Adolphus Mordecai Hart (April 11, 1814 – March 23, 1879) was a Canadian lawyer and author, the son of Ezekiel Hart.

Publications

References

 

1814 births
1879 deaths
Adolphus Hart
Jewish Canadian writers
Canadian lawyers
Canadian non-fiction writers
Canadian people of English-Jewish descent
Canadian people of German-Jewish descent
People from Trois-Rivières
19th-century Canadian Jews